Jewish Book Week is a literary festival in London, held annually in February and March, that explores Jewish literature, ideas and culture. The festival was founded in 1952 and since 2012 it has been presented at Kings Place. It is organised by the UK Jewish Book Council and its director is Claudia Rubinstein.

See also
 Jewish Book Council, a United States organization
 Jewish Book Month, an annual event in  the United States

References

External links
 Official website
 Jewish Book Council (UK): official website

1952 establishments in the United Kingdom
Annual events in the United Kingdom
Festivals established in 1952
Jewish British culture
Jewish organisations based in the United Kingdom
Literary festivals in England
Book fairs in the United Kingdom